Paul Fontaine Mersereau (1873 in Rheims, France – ??) was a French painter. He emigrated to Shreveport, Louisiana, after studying at the Académie Julian in Paris with Jean-Joseph Benjamin-Constant and also with George Inness, and also spent time in Texas. He crossed the US exhibiting his work.

Mersereau was President of the Southern National Academy of Design until 1933 when succeeded by Nan Sheets, and a member of the Society of American Artists. His work is included in numerous public collections in Arkansas, Mississippi, and Louisiana.

References

External links
 The Artists' Bluebook website

Further reading and sources
Dunbier, Lonnie Pierson, The Artists Bluebook 2005.
Falk, Peter Hastings, "Who Was Who in American Art 1564-1975" Madison, CT, Sound View Press 1999.

1873 births
19th-century American painters
American male painters
20th-century American painters
Year of death missing
French emigrants to the United States
19th-century American male artists
20th-century American male artists